is a Japanese professional tennis player. Her highest WTA rankings are No. 30 in singles and No. 77 in doubles.

Doi reached two junior Grand Slam doubles finals – at Wimbledon in 2007 with Kurumi Nara, and at the Australian Open in 2008, with Elena Bogdan (losing both). She has made it to three WTA tournament finals (only winning one). She is managed by Muse Group, a sports marketing agency based in Tokyo.

Junior career
Doi began playing tennis at the age of six. She first distinguished herself in tennis as a middle-school student, reaching the semifinals of the All Japan Middle School Tennis Championships in both 2004 and 2006 and joining the ITF Junior Circuit in 2006. In 2007, while enrolled as a freshman in Sundai Kōei High School, Doi earned second place in the Japan Open Junior Championships in Nagoya.

A highlight of Doi's junior career was her successful doubles partnership with age-mate Kurumi Nara. They placed second in girls' doubles at the 2007 Wimbledon Championships, becoming only the second Japanese pair to reach the finals of a Grand Slam juniors event since Yuka Yoshida and Hiroko Mochizuki at the 1993 US Open. Doi and Nara continued their run by advancing to the girls' doubles semifinals at a number of high-profile tournaments, such as the 2007 US Open and Wimbledon 2008. Doi also teamed with Romanian Elena Bogdan to place second in girls' doubles at the 2008 Australian Open. This flurry of successes catapulted Doi to No. 3 in Japan's under-18 tennis rankings for 2007; she had been recognized early on as one of Japan's rising stars in junior tennis.

2008 marked Doi's first participation in ITF Women's Circuit events. She partnered with Kurumi Nara again for the 2008 ITF event in Miyazaki, where they upset top-seeded sisters Erika and Yurika Sema, 3–6, 6–3, [10–6] in the second round. Doi and Nara went on to triumph over Kimiko Date-Krumm and Tomoko Yonemura in the final.

Professional career

2006–09: First ITF title and qualifiers on WTA Tour
Doi officially turned pro in June 2006, at the age of 15. In 2009, she focused primarily on Japanese tournaments, where she earned two first-place and two second-place finishes in singles and one second-place result in doubles. In March 2009, she won her first ITF title at the $10k Kofu event. In October, she made her tour debut in the qualifiers of the Japan Women's Open, falling to American Abigail Spears in the second qualifying round. Doi was seeded sixth in the women's singles draw of the All Japan Tennis Championships. She lost in straight sets to Akiko Morigami in the round of 16. Her performance in 2009's events lifted Doi from a year-opening ranking of No. 613 to a year-end mark of No. 199 and a place among the top 10-players in Japanese tennis.

2010: First Grand Slam qualifying
In 2010, Doi began playing professional tournaments outside Japan. She appeared in the women's singles qualifiers for that year's Australian Open. Doi then made appearances at several circuit tournaments, placing second in singles at Irapuato, Mexico in March. In doubles, she recorded three second-place finishes in as many weeks in April tournaments at Incheon, Gimhae, and Changwon, South Korea, with partner Junri Namigata. With new partner Kotomi Takahata, Doi won her first $50k title in doubles at the Fukuoka International in May, defeating Marina Erakovic and Alexandra Panova in straight sets.

Her success continued in the qualifying rounds of the French Open, where she defeated Mandy Minella and upset Michelle Larcher de Brito to reach the qualifier finals. With her victory over Vitalia Diatchenko, Doi had earned a spot in her first major tournament main draw, where she lost to Polona Hercog in the first round. She finished the year with a first-place performance in the All Japan Tennis Championships women's singles.

2011: First Grand Slam main-draw win
Doi's Grand Slam results improved in 2011, when she qualified for Wimbledon and had her first win in Grand Slam tournament against Bethanie Mattek-Sands. She went on to defeat Zheng Jie before losing in the third round to Sabine Lisicki.

2012: First WTA Tour quarterfinal
The Birmingham Classic was Doi's first appearance in the quarterfinals of a singles tour event, which she reached by defeating the top seed Francesca Schiavone in two sets. Although Doi lost in the Wimbledon qualifiers to Kristina Mladenovic, she received a lucky loser berth in the main tournament. She was defeated by her first-round opponent Arantxa Rus.

After failing to qualify for the main draws of the US Open and Pan Pacific Open, Doi found success at the Japan Women's Open, where she defeated Chanelle Scheepers in three sets to reach her first tour semifinal.

2013: Main-draw appearance at all major tournaments
2013 marked the first year in which Doi qualified for all four Grand Slam tournaments. In the Australian Open, she reached the second round after a two-set victory over Petra Martić, before losing 0–6, 0–6 to Maria Sharapova. She lost in the first round in the other three major events. At the French Open she faced Madison Keys; at Wimbledon Sílvia Soler Espinosa; and at the US Open Petra Kvitová.

2016: Wimbledon fourth round, top 30 debut

At the Australian Open, Doi played the seventh seed Angelique Kerber in the first round, winning the first set and holding a match point in the second-set tie-break before eventually losing in three sets. Kerber went on to win the title. On 16 May, she achieved a new career-high ranking of world No. 38, after her quarterfinal appearance in the Italian Open.

Doi competed at the Birmingham Classic, losing to Johanna Konta. She then reached the last 16 of Wimbledon, beating Louisa Chirico, Karolína Plíšková and Anna-Lena Friedsam before losing to Kerber, in straight sets. Doi was the first Japanese player to reach the fourth round of the ladies draw since Ai Sugiyama ten years earlier.

She made her top 30 debut on 10 October 2016.

Personal background
Doi is coached by Christian Zahalka since April 2015. Her most admired players are Justine Henin and Shingo Kunieda. She uses a Srixon racquet and ASICS shoes, prefers to play on hardcourts, and favors her forehand and serve.

Performance timelines

Only main-draw results in WTA Tour, Grand Slam tournaments, Fed Cup/Billie Jean King Cup and Olympic Games are included in win–loss records.

Singles
Current through the 2023 Australian Open.

Doubles

WTA career finals

Singles: 3 (1 title, 2 runner-ups)

Doubles: 3 (2 titles, 1 runner-up)

WTA Challenger finals

Singles: 4 (2 titles, 2 runner-ups)

Doubles: 5 (4 titles, 1 runner-up)

ITF Circuit finals

Singles: 11 (7 titles, 4 runner–ups)

Doubles: 14 (6 titles, 8 runner–ups)

Wins over top 10-players

Notes

References

External links

 Misaki Doi official website 
 
 
 
 Japan Tennis Association profile (in Japanese)
 Misaki Doi's personal blog (in Japanese)

1991 births
Living people
Japanese female tennis players
People from Ōamishirasato
Sportspeople from Yokohama
Sportspeople from Chiba Prefecture
Sportspeople from Kanagawa Prefecture
Asian Games medalists in tennis
Tennis players at the 2010 Asian Games
Olympic tennis players of Japan
Tennis players at the 2016 Summer Olympics
Tennis players at the 2020 Summer Olympics
Medalists at the 2010 Asian Games
Asian Games bronze medalists for Japan
20th-century Japanese women
21st-century Japanese women